Jesper Hougaard (born  1984) is a poker player from Copenhagen, Denmark who has won two bracelets at the World Series of Poker.

Hougaard won his first World Series of Poker bracelet in a $1,500 No Limit Hold'em event in 2008. Later that same year, he won another bracelet in the  £1,500 No Limit Hold'em event at the second World Series of Poker Europe in London. With his second bracelet, Hougaard became the first player to win a bracelet in Las Vegas and London.

His other poker accomplishments include a 356th-place finish in the 2007 Main Event, and a victory in the online tournament Sunday Million on PokerStars for $147,000 (April 2008).

Jesper Hougaard is co-founder of the Danish department of the international poker community Donkr.com.

Prior to becoming a professional poker player, Hougaard was a member of the National Table Tennis team in Denmark.

As of 2009, his total winnings exceed $1,000,000. His 8 cashes at the WSOP account for $970,241 of those winnings.

World Series of Poker Bracelets 

An "E" following a year denotes bracelet(s) won at the World Series of Poker Europe

References

Danish poker players
World Series of Poker bracelet winners
1980s births
Living people